Sigma is a signature format  based on pattern matching for system logging, to detect malicious behavior in computer systems.

See also 

 YARA
 Snort

Further reading

References

External links 
 GitHub repository
 sigmatools on PyPi

Computer forensics